William Brian Kelly (25 September 1937 – March 2013) was an English professional footballer who played as a centre forward for Dover, Queens Park Rangers, Bexleyheath & Welling, Romford and Bexley United.

References

1937 births
2013 deaths
English footballers
Dover F.C. players
Queens Park Rangers F.C. players
Bexley United F.C. players
Romford F.C. players
English Football League players
Association football forwards